Jan Olesiński (born 26 September 1956) is a former Polish modern pentathlete. He competed at the 1980 Summer Olympics.

References

1956 births
Living people
Polish male modern pentathletes
Olympic modern pentathletes of Poland
Modern pentathletes at the 1980 Summer Olympics
Sportspeople from Katowice